An impact winter is a hypothesized period of prolonged cold weather due to the impact of a large asteroid or comet on the Earth's surface. If an asteroid were to strike land or a shallow body of water, it would eject an enormous amount of dust, ash, and other material into the atmosphere, blocking the radiation from the Sun. This would cause the global temperature to decrease drastically. It has been proposed that an impact winter could lead to mass extinction, wiping out many of the world's existing species. The Cretaceous–Paleogene extinction event probably involved an impact winter, and led to mass extinction of most tetrapods weighing more than 25 kilograms (55 pounds).

Possibility of impact
The meteors that do make it to the surface tend to strike unpopulated areas and cause no harm. A human is more likely to die in a fire, flood, or other natural disaster than to die because of an asteroid or comet impact. Another study in 1994 found a 1-in-10,000 chance that the Earth will be hit by a large asteroid or comet with a diameter of about  during the next century. This object would be capable of disrupting the ecosphere and would kill a large fraction of the world's population. One such object, Asteroid 1950 DA, currently has a 0.005% chance of colliding with Earth in the year 2880, though when first discovered the probability was 0.3%. The probability goes down as orbits are refined with additional measurements.

Over 300 short-period comets pass near larger planets, such as Saturn and Jupiter, which can change the comets' trajectories and could potentially put them into an Earth-crossing orbit. This could happen for long-period comets also but the chance is highest for short-period comets. The chance of these directly impacting Earth is far lower than a near-Earth object (NEO) impact. Victor Clube and Bill Napier support a controversial theory that a short-period comet in an Earth-crossing orbit does not need to impact to be hazardous, as it could disintegrate and cause a dust veil with possibilities of a "nuclear winter" scenario with long-term global cooling lasting for thousands of years (which they consider to be similar in probability to a 1 km impact).

Necessary impact factors
The Earth experiences a never-ending barrage of cosmic debris. Small particles burn up as they enter the atmosphere and are visible as meteors.  Many of them go unnoticed by the average person even though not all of them burn up before they hit the Earth's surface. Those that strike the surface are known as meteorites. Thus, not every object that hits the Earth will cause an extinction-level event or even cause any real harm. Objects release most of their kinetic energy in the atmosphere and will explode if they experience a column of atmosphere greater than or equal to their mass. Extinction-level impacts on the Earth occur about every 100 million years. Although extinction events happen very rarely, large projectiles can do severe damage. This section will discuss the nature of the hazards posed by projectiles as a function of their size and composition.

Size
A large asteroid or comet could  collide with the Earth's surface with the force of hundreds to thousands of times the force of all the nuclear bombs on the Earth. For example, the K/T boundary impact has been proposed to have caused extinction of all non-avian dinosaurs 66 million years ago. This means it hit with nearly a force of 100,000,000 MT (418 ZJ). That is over six billion times larger than the atomic bomb yield (16 kilotons, 67 TJ) that was dropped on Hiroshima during WW2. An asteroid, meteor, or comet would remain intact through the atmosphere by virtue of its sheer mass. However, an object smaller than  would have to have a strong iron composition to breach the lower atmosphere - the troposphere or the lower levels of the stratosphere.

Composition
There are three different composition types for an asteroid or comet: metallic, stony and icy. The composition of the object determines whether or not it will make it to the Earth's surface in one piece, disintegrate before breaching the atmosphere, or break up and explode just before reaching the surface. A metallic object tends to be made up of iron and nickel alloys. These metallic objects are the most likely to impact the surface because they stand up better to the stresses of ram pressure induced flattening and fragmentation during deceleration in the atmosphere. The stony objects, like chondritic meteorites, tend to burn, break up, or explode before leaving the upper atmosphere. The porous comet-like objects are made up of low-density silicates, organics, ice, volatile and often burn up in the upper atmosphere because of their low bulk density (≤).

Possible mechanisms

Although the asteroids and comets that impact the Earth hit with many times the explosive force of a volcano, the mechanisms of an impact winter are similar to those that occur after a mega-volcanic eruption-induced volcanic winter. In this scenario massive amounts of debris injected into the atmosphere would block some of the sun's radiation for an extended period of time and lower the mean global temperature by as much as 20° C after a year. The two main mechanisms that could lead to an impact winter are mass ejection of regolith and multiple firestorms.

Mass ejection of regolith

Anything larger would fall quickly back to the surface. These particles would then be spread throughout the atmosphere and absorb or refract the sunlight before it is able to reach the surface, cooling the planet in a similar fashion as the sulfurous aerosol rising from a megavolcano, producing deep global dimming. This is controversially purported to have occurred following the Toba eruption.

These pulverized rock particles would remain in the atmosphere until dry deposition and due to their size, they would also act as cloud condensation nuclei and would be washed out by wet deposition/precipitation, but even then, about 15% of the sun's radiation might not reach the surface. After the first 20 days, the land temperature might drop quickly, by about 13° C. After about a year, the temperature could rebound by about 6° C, but by this time about one-third of the Northern Hemisphere might be covered in ice.

However, this effect could be largely mitigated, even reversed, by a release of enormous quantities of water vapor and carbon dioxide caused by the initial global heat pulse after the impact. If the asteroid hit an ocean (which would be the case with the majority of impact events), water vapor would form the majority of any ejected matter, and would likely result in a major greenhouse effect and a net increase in temperature.

If the impact event is sufficiently energetic it might cause mantle plume (volcanism) at the antipodal point (the opposite side of the world). This volcanism could alone therefore create a volcanic winter, irrespective of the other impact effects.

Multiple firestorms

In combination with the initial debris ejected into the atmosphere, if the impactor is extremely large ( or more), like the K/T boundary impactor (estimated ), there might be the ignition of multiple fire storms, possibly with a global reach into every dense and therefore firestorm-prone forest. These wood fires might release enough amounts of water vapor, ash, soot, tar and carbon dioxide into the atmosphere to perturb the climate on their own and cause the pulverized rock dust cloud blocking the sun to last longer. Alternatively it could cause it to last for a much shorter time, as there would be more water vapor for the rocky aerosol particles to form cloud condensation nuclei. If it causes the dust cloud to last longer, it would prolong the Earth's cooling time, possibly causing thicker ice sheets to form.

Past events

In 2016, a scientific drilling project drilled deep into the peak ring of the Chicxulub impact crater to obtain rock core samples from the impact itself. This crater is one of the best known impact craters and was the impact responsible for the extinction of the dinosaurs.

The discoveries were widely seen as confirming current theories related to both the crater impact and its effects. They confirmed that the rock comprising the peak ring had been subjected to immense pressures and forces, and had been melted by immense heat and shocked by immense pressure from its usual state into its present form in just minutes. The fact that the peak ring was made of granite was also significant, since granite is not a rock found in sea-floor deposits – it originates much deeper in the earth and had been ejected to the surface by the immense pressures of impact. Gypsum, a sulfate-containing rock that is usually present in the shallow seabed of the region, had been almost entirely removed and must therefore have been almost entirely vaporized and entered the atmosphere, and that the event was immediately followed by a huge megatsunami (a massive movement of sea waters) sufficient to lay down the largest known layer of sand separated by grain size directly above the peak ring.

These strongly support the hypothesis that the impactor was large enough to create a 120-mile peak ring, eject molten granite from deep within the earth, create colossal water movements, and eject an immense quantity of vaporized rock and sulfates into the atmosphere, where they would have persisted for a long time. This global dispersion of dust and sulfates would have led to a sudden and catastrophic effect on the climate worldwide by causing large temperature drops, devastating the food chain.

Impact on humans
An impact winter would have a devastating effect on humans, as well as the other species on Earth. With the sun's radiation being severely diminished, the first species to die would be plants and animals who survive through the process of photosynthesis. This lack of food would ultimately lead to other mass extinctions of other animals that are higher up on the food chain and possibly kill up to 25% of the human population.  Depending on location and size of the initial impact, the cost of clean-up efforts could be so high as to cause an economic crisis for the survivors. These factors would make life on Earth, for humans, extremely difficult.

Agriculture

With the Earth's atmosphere full of dust and other material, radiation from the sun would be refracted and scattered back into space and absorbed by this debris. The first effect on the Earth, after the blast wave and  potential multiple fire storms, would be the death of most, if not all, of the photosynthetic life forms on Earth. Those in the ocean that survive would possibly become dormant until the sun came out again. Those on land could possibly be kept alive in underground microclimates, with one such example being the Zbrašov aragonite caves. Greenhouses in underground complexes with fossil or nuclear energy power stations could conceivably keep artificial sunlight growing lamps on until the atmosphere began to clear. Meanwhile, those outside that were not killed by the lack of sunlight would most likely be killed or kept dormant by the extreme cold of the impact winter. This death of plants might lead to a long period of famine if enough people survived the initial blast wave and would result in increased food costs in undeveloped countries only a few months after the first crop failures. Developed countries wouldn't encounter famine unless the cooling event was to last longer than a year, due to larger canned food and grain stockpiles in these countries. However, if the impactor was similar in size to the K/T boundary impactor, agricultural losses might not be compensated with imports to the northern hemisphere from the southern hemisphere or vice versa. The only way to keep from starving would be for each country to amass at least a year's worth of food for their people. Not many countries have this; the world's average cereal stock levels are only about 30% of the yearly production.

Economics
The cost to clean up after an asteroid or comet impact would cost billions to trillions of dollars, depending on the location impacted.  An impact in New York City (the 16th most populated city in the world) could cost billions of dollars in financial losses and it could take years for the financial sector (i.e. stock market) to recover. However, the probability of such a naturally specifically aimed impact would be exceedingly low.

Survivability

See also
Asteroid deflection strategies
Earth Impact Database
Impact event
List of notable asteroids
Near Earth Asteroids
Near-Earth objects
Nuclear winter

References

External links
 Geotimes story on the Chicxulub impact and the possibility of an impact winter
 NASA's Near Earth Object Program

Impact events
Cosmic doomsday
Climate forcing